The 1920 Arizona gubernatorial election took place on November 2, 1920, for the post of the Governor of Arizona. Thomas Campbell won a second term in office, winning a full majority of the popular vote for the first time in three consecutive elections. He beat the sole challenger, Secretary of State Mit Simms. This would be the last office Campbell would win, while Sims would return in the 1930s to win several terms in his old offices of Treasurer and Secretary of State

Thomas Campbell was sworn in for his second term on January 3, 1921.

General election

Results

References

1920
Arizona
Gubernatorial
November 1920 events in the United States